Georgootty C/O Georgootty is a 1991 Indian Malayalam–language romantic comedy / drama film starring Jayaram, Thilakan and Sunitha in major roles. It was directed by Haridas and written by Ranjith, the film was produced under the banner of Chandragiri Productions. It was Haridas' directorial debut. Haridas got the Kerala State Film Award for Best New Face Director for this film. The music was composed by Mohan Sithara with lyrics by Gireesh Puthenchery.

Plot
George Kutty is a senior engineering student. His family, once rich, is now struggling financially after going through a drawn-out legal issue. He has three younger sisters.

Ittichen is a rich but miserly, cruel and uncultured landlord. His daughter Alice lives in the world of novels that come in weekly magazines. To save George's family from hardship, Chandy, the marriage broker, brings Alice together with George Kutty. He lies to Ittichen about the wealth and status of George's family. Ittichen learns the truth very late and vents his anger on George. Despite being a brilliant student with excellent job prospect, George is forced to stay at his in-laws' house doing menial jobs. He accepts his fate since he also was a part of the initial fraud. When it becomes too much for him to bear, he changes his approach and decides to take on his father-in-law.

With the help of his old friend, a police Inspector in the area and other friends, he teaches Ittichen a lesson. Also, he saves Ittichen's life from a local bully. Ittichen accepts George not only as his son-in-law but also as his own son. Once denied the right to go outside, George and Alice set off with Ittichen's blessings.

Cast

References

External links
 
 Georgootty C/O Georgootty at the Malayalam Movie Database
 Georgootty C/O Georgootty at Oneindia.in

1990s Malayalam-language films
Films scored by Mohan Sithara
1991 romantic drama films
1991 films
1991 directorial debut films
Indian romantic drama films